is Crystal Kay's 26th single. It was released on November 24, 2010 as the lead single to Spin the Music.

Background and promotion 

"Journey (Kimi to Futari de)" is Kay's first release since Flash in June 2010, and her first single in 15 months. It was released just two weeks before Kay's ninth studio album Spin the Music. The release was first announced on September 30 on Kay's official website. The title track was featured in commercials for Japanese skincare range Attenir. The commercial began airing from October 6 onwards. The single features "HOLD ON" as its b-side. The song was used as the theme song to the 2009 film adaption of Dolan's Cadillac. It was first announced that Kay would sing for the film on August 16, 2008.

Music video 
The music video for "Journey (Kimi to Futari de)" was directed by Amber, it was revealed in early November. The video features a tearful Kay reminiscing on various times in a past relationship, such as Kay and her former lover together at a park and having dinner. The video then subsequently ends with Kay crying to herself softly.

Track listing

Charts

Release history

References 

2010 singles
Crystal Kay songs
Songs written by Joey Carbone
2010 songs
Epic Records singles